

The Dornier Do 14 was a prototype seaplane, developed by Dornier Flugzeugwerke with backing from the Luftwaffe for experimental propulsion studies. The aircraft was similar to the Dornier Do 12. Only one Dornier Do 14 was constructed for testing, the aircraft registered as "D-AGON", after test flights during 1936, the aircraft engines were subsequently dismantled in 1937. The prototype aircraft was finally scrapped in 1939.

Specifications

References

Do 014